Susumansky District is an administrative district (raion), one of the eight in Magadan Oblast, Russia. As a municipal division, it is incorporated as Susumansky Urban Okrug. It is located in the southeast of the oblast and borders the Sakha Republic in the west and north, Srednekansky District in the east, and Yagodninsky and Tenkinsky Districts in the south. Its administrative center is the town of Susuman. As of the 2010 Census, the total population of the district was 9,015, with the population of Susuman accounting for 65.0% of that number.

Geography
The landscape of the district is mostly mountainous. The Nera Plateau and the Tas-Kystabyt are located in the northwestern part of the district.

History
The district was established on December 2, 1953.

Administrative and municipal status
Within the framework of administrative divisions, Susumansky District is one of the eight in the oblast. The town of Susuman serves as its administrative center.

As a municipal division, the district has been incorporated as Susumansky Urban Okrug since May 1, 2015. Prior to that date, the district was incorporated as Susumansky Municipal District, which was subdivided into three urban settlements and one rural settlement.

Economy
The main industries in the district are gold and coal mining. Despite being rich in natural resources, the district economy suffered in the first decades of the 2000s. The severe climate and poorly developed infrastructure are partly to blame, but the difficult transition from Soviet times has led to the collapse of a number of companies with the result that many inhabitants have left the region.

Notable residents 

Oleksandr Romanovskyi (born 1952 in Neksykan village), Ukrainian politician
Efim Shifrin (born 1956 in Neksykan village), actor and singer

References

Notes

Sources

Districts of Magadan Oblast
States and territories established in 1953